Lejaun Perry Simmons (born 7 April 1993) is a striker who plays for Robin Hood and the Bermuda national football team.

Career

Lejaun Simmons started his career at major Bermudian side Devonshire Cougars, being in the youth team for 2 years before being promoted to the first team in 2011. In 2013 he began training with Ilkeston, after the English club developed a link-up with Bermuda Hogges in order to create a pathway to professional football for promising Bermudian players. During the 2013–14 season he made seven appearances for the club (six in the league), and also had loan spells with Mickleover Sports and Long Eaton United. 

He was still with the club in December 2014, however he did not make any appearances during the 2014–15 season. He had left the club by December 2015, returning to Bermuda with Robin Hood. He signed a three-year contract in August 2017.

International career

Lejaun made his debut against Haiti on 9 September 2012, in the CONCACAF Gold Cup. He scored his first goal just 2 days later against Saint Martin in the same competition.

International goals
Scores and results list Bermuda's goal tally first.

References

1993 births
Living people
Bermudian footballers
Devonshire Cougars players
Ilkeston F.C. players
Mickleover Sports F.C. players
Long Eaton United F.C. players
Robin Hood F.C. players
Bermuda international footballers
Association football forwards
2019 CONCACAF Gold Cup players